For the species misidentified by Gyllenhal in 1827 and declared a new species under the name Nicrophorus sepultor, but later corrected, see Nicrophorus vestigator

Nicrophorus sepultor is a burying beetle described by Toussaint de Charpentier in 1825. It has a Palearctic distribution from Europe to central Asia.

References

Silphidae
Beetles of Asia
Beetles of Europe
Taxa named by Toussaint de Charpentier
Beetles described in 1825